2000 Belarusian First League was the tenth season of 2nd level football championship in Belarus. It started in April and ended in November 2000.

Team changes from 1999 season
Two best teams of 1999 Belarusian First League (Kommunalnik Slonim and Vedrich-97 Rechitsa) were promoted to Belarusian Premier League. They were replaced by two lowest placed teams of 1999 Premier League (Molodechno and Svisloch-Krovlya Osipovichi).

Two lowest placed teams of the 1999 First League (Pinsk-900 and Vitbich-Dinamo-Energo Vitebsk) relegated to the Second League. They were replaced by two newcomers from the Second League (Traktor Minsk and Luninets as the winners of their respective groups).

Before the start of the season Kommunalnik Svetlogorsk were renamed to Khimik Svetlogorsk.

Overview
This season winners Molodechno were promoted to the Premier League. Four lowest placed teams (Traktor Minsk, Khimik Svetlogorsk, Veino-Dnepr and Polesye Kozenki) were initially relegated to the Second League, although Khimik Svetlogorsk later avoided relegation due to withdrawal of two other teams before 2001 season.

Teams and locations

League table

Top goalscorers

See also
2000 Belarusian Premier League
1999–2000 Belarusian Cup
2000–01 Belarusian Cup

External links
RSSSF

Belarusian First League seasons
2
Belarus
Belarus